The discography of Colombian pop singer Fanny Lu consists of three studio albums, one compilation album and eighteen singles. Fanny Lu's debut album, Lágrimas Cálidas, released in August 2006. It peaked the number one in two countries, the album spawned three singles "No Te Pido Flores", "Y Si Te Digo" and "Te Arrepentirás". This album is characterized for the fusion of vallenato and tropical rhythms, becoming a tropipop album.

In December 2008 was released the second studio album Dos. The album debuted at #70 on Latin Albums chart in the US and was certified Gold in Mexico, were singles: "Tú No Eres Para Mi" reaching the number one on the US Latin charts and peak #6 on Bubbling Under Hot 100 being very strange for a Spanish song. The song is the most successful on her career. The next singles that follow were "Celos", "Corazón Perdido" and "Mar de Amor". More later in November 2011, Fanny Lu released her third studio album Felicidad y Perpetua, the first album being the executive producer, four singles had been released: "Fanfarrón", "Ni Loca", "Don Juan" and "La Mala". The three first reaching the number one in Venezuela. Recently after one year of has released her fourth studio album, decided with Universal Music Latino released a greatest hits album Voz y Éxitos. Fanny Lu has sold more than 3 million albums worldwide.

Albums

Studio albums

Compilation albums

Singles

As lead artist

As featured artist 

Notes
A.  "Y Si Te Digo" did not enter the Billboard Hot 100, but peaked at number 19 on the Bubbling Under Hot 100 Singles chart, which acts as a 25-song extension to the Hot 100.
B.  "Tú No Eres Para Mi" did not enter the Billboard Hot 100, but peaked at number 6 on the Bubbling Under Hot 100 Singles chart, which acts as a 25-song extension to the Hot 100.

Music videos

References
General

 
 

Specific

Latin pop music discographies
Tropical music discographies
Discographies of Colombian artists